Lewis Glacier is the northerly of two glaciers flowing from Hemimont Plateau east into Seligman Inlet, on the east coast of Graham Land, Antarctica. The glacier was photographed from the air by the United States Antarctic Service in 1940. It was charted in 1947 by the Falkland Islands Dependencies Survey, who named it for British glaciologist William Vaughan Lewis, a lecturer at the Department of Geography, Cambridge University.

References

Glaciers of Graham Land
Bowman Coast